The John Anson Ford Theatre is a music venue in the Hollywood Hills neighborhood of Los Angeles, California. The 1,200-seat outdoor amphitheater is situated within the Cahuenga Pass within the Santa Monica Mountains. Located in a County regional park, the facility is owned by the County of Los Angeles and operated in partnership with the Ford Theatre Foundation and the Los Angeles County Department of Parks and Recreation. The Ford has been operated by the Los Angeles Philharmonic since 2020.

History

Christine Wetherill Stevenson and The Pilgrimage Play 
An amphitheatre was built in 1920 as a venue for The Pilgrimage Play. The author, Christine Wetherill Stevenson, believed the rugged beauty of the Cahuenga Pass would provide a dramatic outdoor setting for the play. Together with Mrs. Chauncey D. Clark, she purchased the land along with that on which the Hollywood Bowl now sits.  A wooden, outdoor amphitheatre was built on the site and the play was performed by noted actors every summer from 1920 to 1929, until the original structure was destroyed by a brush fire in October 1929.

Rebuild and Renaming 
A new theatre was constructed of poured concrete and designed in the style of ancient Judaic architecture to resemble the gates of Jerusalem on the same site and opened in 1931. The Pilgrimage Play was again performed there, interrupted only by World War II.  In 1941 the land was deeded to the County of Los Angeles. The Pilgrimage Play continued to be presented until a lawsuit in 1964 forced its closure because of its religious nature.

In 1976, the Pilgrimage Theatre was renamed the John Anson Ford Theatre in honor of the late LA County Supervisor's significant support of the arts. John Anson Ford (1883–1983) helped found the LA County Arts Commission, encouraged the Board of Supervisors to support the building of The Music Center and led the County's acquisition of Descanso Gardens, among many other achievements. The 1,200 seat amphitheatre and an 87-seat indoor black box theatre built underneath the amphitheatre in 1971 were used intermittently for Shakespearean theatre, jazz concerts and dance performances until former County Supervisor Ed Edelman revived the historic theatre, spurring the creation of the Ford Amphitheatre Summer Season (originally called "Summer Nights at the Ford") in 1993 and obtaining funding for capital improvements to the facility.

Ford Theatres Project 
Starting in 2014, the Ford Theatres began the process of undergoing a series of renovations that would rehabilitate and improve the current historic theatre and add new facilities and amenities within the current boundaries of the Ford Theatres property. After two years of renovations, the Ford reopened in 2016 with completion of Phase One of the Ford Theatres Project.

Summer Season and Partnership Program 
The Ford summer season's partnership program was designed to enable Los Angeles County music, dance and theatre groups to produce successfully in a major venue. Unlike a typical presenting model, groups and producers are selected through a competitive application process and receive front of house, production and marketing support, while keeping the bulk of the box office proceeds. From that first summer series in 1993, the program has  supported hundreds of local arts organizations and producers.

The Ford Theatres presents an eclectic season of music, dance, theatre, film and family events reflective of the communities that comprise Los Angeles County. In addition to its multidisciplinary partnership program, the Ford's summer season includes a 10-part series showcasing artists from around the world, a six-part series for families and interactive participatory arts events that take place at its amphitheatre in Hollywood and at public sites across the County.

References

External links
 
 100-Year Timeline

Theatres in Los Angeles
Hollywood Hills
Amphitheaters in California
Theatres completed in 1920
Theatres completed in 1931
Landmarks in Los Angeles
Santa Monica Mountains
Event venues established in 1920
Music venues in Los Angeles